William Murray Stone, D.D. (June 1, 1779–February 26, 1838) was an American Episcopal clergyman from Maryland. He was bishop of the Episcopal Diocese of Maryland at Baltimore from 1830 until his death.

Early life
William was born in Somerset County to John and Betsy (Murray) Stone. His family had been important in the development of Maryland for over a hundred years. His great-great-grandfather William Stone had served as governor of the colony, and a cousin (Thomas Stone) signed the Declaration of Independence. William attended Washington College in Chestertown, Maryland and graduated in 1799. After college, Stone studied theology.

Ministry

Bishop Thomas Claggett ordained him a deacon in Prince George's County on December 3, 1803. After his ordination as priest, Kemp became rector of Stepney Parish then in Somerset County, Maryland. He served there for over twenty years until he was transferred to be rector of St. Paul's in Chestertown, Maryland in 1829.

After the unexpected death of bishop James Kemp in 1827, Maryland's clergy and lay delegates deadlocked as to his successor, and both future Massachusetts bishop Manton Eastburn and missionary bishop Jackson Kemper refused the position. In 1830 the diocesan convention again deadlocked as the same two prominent candidates (John Johns of the low-church party and William Edward Wyatt of the high church party) tied for election as bishop. Stone, although sickly, was nominated as a compromise candidate. His election was nearly unanimous. He was consecrated as bishop on October 21, 1830 in Baltimore by Bishops William White, Richard Channing Moore and Henry U. Onderdonk. Bishop Stone published a number of Pastoral Letters and some sermons.

Death and legacy
He died in 1838 at Salisbury, Maryland and is buried next to his wife Anne Savage Stone (d. 1821) at the Parsons Cemetery in Wicomico County.

References

1779 births
1838 deaths
People from Somerset County, Maryland
Washington College alumni
19th-century Anglican bishops in the United States
Stone family
Episcopal bishops of Maryland